Caazapá is a city in Paraguay, founded in 1607, by Friar Luis de Bolaños. It is located in the Caazapá District and is the capital of the Caazapá Department.  The name Caazapá comes from the Guarani words "Ka'aguy jehasapa" which means "after the forest", because the natives believed that after the forest, God, with the attendance of Friar Luis de Bolaños, has made born water from the Earth. There are five neighbourhoods called "Barrios" in the city: Then main one is the Barrio San Pablo, the other 4 are: Barrio Santa Teresita, Barrio San Blás, Barrio San Antonio, and Barrio San Roque-within which is the original Chapel, built by franciscans during the famous Jesuit reductions of Paraguay. The Franciscan Reduction at Caazapá was an important event in Paraguayan cultural heritage.

References

Geografía Ilustrada del Paraguay, Distribuidora Arami SRL; 2007.
Geografía del Paraguay, Primera Edición 1999, Editorial Hispana Paraguay SRL

External links
 https://web.archive.org/web/20110708110526/http://www.caazapapotyfm.com/

Populated places in the Caazapá Department
1607 establishments in South America